The Montana State Bobcats women's basketball team represents Montana State University in Bozeman, Montana, United States. The school's team currently competes in the Big Sky Conference. They play their home games at Worthington Arena.

History
Montana State began play in 1976. They joined the Northwest Women's Basketball League in 1978. They joined the Mountain West Athletic Conference in 1983.  They played in the WNIT in 1988, 2003, and 2016. As of the end of the 2016-17 season, the Bobcats have an all-time record of 593-530.

NCAA tournament results
The Bobcats have appeared in three NCAA Tournaments, with a combined record of 0–3.

References

External links